Destination Miami: Objective Murder (Italian: Appuntamento a Dallas) is a 1964 Italian drama film directed by Piero Regnoli and featuring Claudio Gora, Bella Cortez and Nico Fidenco in lead roles.

References

External links
 

1964 films
1960s Italian-language films
Films directed by Piero Regnoli
1964 drama films
Italian drama films
Films scored by Nico Fidenco
1960s Italian films